William McArdle (October 5, 1848 – March 17, 1908) was a Canadian-American politician in the state of Washington. He served in the Washington House of Representatives from 1895 to 1897.

References

Members of the Washington House of Representatives
1848 births
1908 deaths
Washington (state) Populists
19th-century American politicians